Sabrina Bertini (born 30 October 1969) is an Italian volleyball player. She competed in the women's tournament at the 2000 Summer Olympics.

References

1969 births
Living people
Italian women's volleyball players
Olympic volleyball players of Italy
Volleyball players at the 2000 Summer Olympics
Sportspeople from Pisa